The electric-pump-fed engine is a bipropellant rocket engine in which the fuel pumps are electrically powered, and so all of the input propellant is directly burned in the main combustion chamber, and none is diverted to drive the pumps. This differs from traditional rocket engine designs, in which the pumps are driven by a portion of the input propellants.

The pumps are powered by an electric motor, with electricity from a battery bank.

Electrical pumps had been used in the secondary propulsion system of the Agena upper stage vehicle.

As of December 2020, the only rocket engines to use electric propellant pump systems are the Rutherford engine, ten of which power the Electron rocket, and the Delphin engine, five of which power the first stage of Astra Space's Rocket 3. On 21 January 2018, Electron was the first electric pump-fed rocket to reach orbit.

In comparison to turbo-pumped rocket cycles such as staged combustion and gas generator, an electric cycle engine has potentially worse performance due to the added mass of batteries, but may have lower development and manufacturing costs due its mechanical simplicity, its lack of high temperature turbomachinery, and its easier controllability.

See also
 Combustion tap-off cycle
 Expander cycle
 Gas-generator cycle
 Pressure-fed engine
 Rocket engine
 Solid-propellant rocket
 Staged combustion cycle

References 

Combustion
Rocket engines
Rocket engines by cycle
Spacecraft propulsion
Thermodynamic cycles